Baseball in Venezuela originates with the early twentieth century cultural influence of United States oil companies, and is the country's leading sport. Baseball was introduced in Venezuela at the end of the 1910s and at the beginning of the 1920s by American immigrants and workers from the exploding oil industry in the country.

Brief history 
Baseball's definitive explosion in Venezuela was in 1941, the year of the Baseball World Cup in Havana when the national team beat Cuba in the finals. This team was consecrated by the press and the fans as "Los Héroes del '41" (The Heroes of '41). Since that year, baseball has transformed into the nation's most popular sport, a status it enjoys till today. Buoyed by this success, the sport took on a life on its own, and in 1945, the Venezuelan Professional Baseball League (VPBL) was established as the country's primary baseball league.

The VPBL is a winter league that was established in 1945, with Leones del Caracas the leading team; another leading club is Valencia's Navegantes del Magallanes, established in 1917. There are currently 8 teams in the league. There is a Venezuelan Summer League established in 1997 and composed of teams affiliated with Major League Baseball (MLB) clubs. The Liga paralela is a secondary Venezuelan winter league, with the teams acting as farm teams for VPBL clubs. In 2021, the Venezuelan Major League, a summer league circuit, was launched.

Venezuelan teams have won the Caribbean Series a number of times. The Venezuela national baseball team won the Baseball World Cup several times in the 1940s, and the baseball tournament at the Pan American Games in 1959. The team finished 7th in the inaugural World Baseball Classic and 3rd in the 2009 event, but has dropped to 10th in the 2013 event.

Over 350 Venezuelans have played in Major League Baseball since 1939, with 59 Venezuelans playing in MLB as of Opening Day 2014, the second most from any country (after the Dominican Republic). The Luis Aparicio Award was established in 2004, in honor of Luis Aparicio, the only Venezuelan ballplayer to have been inducted into the National Baseball Hall of Fame in Cooperstown, New York. The award is given annually to honor the Venezuelan player who recorded the best individual performance in Major League Baseball, as voted on by sports journalists in Venezuela.

Six MLB teams maintained training academies in Venezuela in 2010, down from 21 in 2002. Possible reasons for the decline include strained relations between the U.S. and Venezuela and the increasingly ubiquitous presence of MLB teams in the country creating more competition for talent there.

The high crime rates prevalent in some parts of Venezuela have occasionally affected those involved with baseball. In November 2011 Washington Nationals catcher Wilson Ramos was kidnapped while home to play for his Venezuelan winter league team, Tigres de Aragua. Two days later he was rescued unharmed by police commandos in the mountains of Carabobo state. Eight people were arrested in connection with the kidnapping.

Out of the 50 players involved in the 2012 Major League Baseball World Series, 9 were Venezuelan.

Baseball stadiums in Venezuela

References

External links
 Venezuelan Professional Baseball League (in Spanish)
  Venezuela World Baseball Classic Homepage
Venezuelan Bust Baseball Boom Scouting: Andres Reiner and Scouting on the New Frontier by Milton H. Jamail